Rockton is an unincorporated community in Clearfield County, Pennsylvania, United States. Rockton has a post office with the ZIP code of 15856.

References

Unincorporated communities in Clearfield County, Pennsylvania
Unincorporated communities in Pennsylvania